Artzosuchus is an extinct genus of basal crocodylomorph. Specimens have been found from the Üüden Sair locality of the Djadochta Formation in Mongolia and date back to the  Campanian stage of the Late Cretaceous. Its classification beyond that of a basal crocodylomorph is indeterminant because of the fragmentary nature of the material associated with the genus.

References

Late Cretaceous crocodylomorphs of Asia
Terrestrial crocodylomorphs
Late Cretaceous lepidosaurs of Asia